CFR Title 30 - Mineral Resources is one of fifty titles comprising the United States Code of Federal Regulations (CFR), containing the principal set of rules and regulations issued by federal agencies regarding national mineral resources. It is available in digital and printed form, and can be referenced online using the Electronic Code of Federal Regulations (e-CFR).

Structure 

The table of contents, as reflected in the e-CFR updated February 28, 2014, is as follows:

 30